Youssef Mansour (born 1944/1945) is an Egyptian billionaire businessman and part owner of the Mansour Group.

Early life
He has two brothers who are also billionaires, Mohamed Mansour and Yasseen Mansour.

Education
Master of Business Administration, Auburn University
Bachelor of Science in Engineering, North Carolina State University

Career
In March 2020, Forbes estimated his net worth at US$1.9 billion.

Personal life
He is married with five children, and lives in Cairo.

References

1940s births
Living people
Egyptian billionaires
North Carolina State University alumni
Auburn University alumni